The cabinet of Dimitrie Ghica was the government of Romania from 16 November 1868 to 27 January 1870.

Ministers
The ministers of the cabinet were as follows:

President of the Council of Ministers:
Dimitrie Ghica (16 November 1868 - 27 January 1870)
Minister of the Interior: 
Mihail Kogălniceanu (16 November 1868 - 24 January 1870)
Dimitrie Ghica (24 - 27 January 1870)
Minister of Foreign Affairs: 
Dimitrie Ghica (16 November 1868 - 26 August 1869)
(interim) Mihail Kogălniceanu (26 August - 28 November 1869)
Nicolae Calimachi-Catargiu (28 November 1869 - 27 January 1870)
Minister of Finance:
Alexandru G. Golescu (16 November 1868 - 27 January 1870)
Minister of Justice:
Vasile Boerescu (16 November 1868 - 21 January 1870)
(interim) Dimitrie Ghica (21 - 24 January 1870)
George Gr. Cantacuzino (24 - 27 January 1870)
Minister of War:
Col. Alexandru Duca (16 November 1868 - 14 July 1869)
Col. George Manu (14 July 1869 - 27 January 1870)
Minister of Religious Affairs and Public Instruction:
Alexandru Papadopol-Calimah (16 - 24 November 1868)
Alexandru Crețescu (24 November 1868 - 12 December 1869)
George Mârzescu (12 December 1869 - 27 January 1870)
Minister of Public Works:
(interim) Dimitrie Ghica (16 November 1868 - 26 August 1869)
Dimitrie Ghica (26 August 1869 - 27 January 1870)

References

Cabinets of Romania
Cabinets established in 1868
Cabinets disestablished in 1870
1868 establishments in Romania
1870 disestablishments in Romania